Piotr Dziewicki (born 26 June 1979) is a Polish football manager and former player who was most recently in charge of Weszło Warsaw.

Career

Club
He has played for Milan Milanówek, Polonia Warsaw and Amica Wronki. At the start of 2006-07 season, he transferred to Turkish side Antalyaspor with fellow Pole Jarosław Bieniuk.

In January 2009 he returned to Polonia Warsaw and he remained there until January 2011 when he moved down one level to play for Dolcan Ząbki. He was released from Dolcan Ząbki on 1 May 2011.

Coaching
After the bankruptcy of KSP Polonia Warsaw Ltd. in June 2013, at the hands of Ireneusz Król. 
Piotr Dziewicki along with Paweł Olczak, where the main figures within the association of Polonia fans led by Grzegorz Popielarz who organized the resurrection of the club, starting from the 4th league (north)(5th tier in Poland). Piotr Dziewicki was nominated as the head coach and manager to create the new Polonia team, on the basis of MKS Polonia Warszawa Youth Academy. He won 6-0 in his debut, against Wkra Żuromin.

In 2022, he became a coach of Weszło Warsaw, a club from a regional league, to which he moved from Ząbkovia Ząbki. He was replaced ahead of the 2022–23 season by Piotr Kobierecki.

References

External links
 

1979 births
Polish footballers
Polish expatriate footballers
Amica Wronki players
Antalyaspor footballers
Polonia Warsaw players
Ząbkovia Ząbki players
Ekstraklasa players
Süper Lig players
Living people
Expatriate footballers in Turkey
People from Milanówek
Sportspeople from Masovian Voivodeship
Association football defenders